According to Russian philologist Aleksey Shakhmatov, Novgorodsko-Sofiysky Svod (Novgorod-Sofia Compilation) is a tentative name for a hypothetical common source for the  Novgorod Fourth Chronicle and the Sofia First Chronicle.  

Shakhmatov initially dated it by 1448 (hence it also used to be called 1448 compilation), but later revised his opinion to 1430s. Some Russian philologists shared his opinion, while others attribute the common source  to the 1418 compilation of Photius, Metropolitan of Moscow.

See also

Complete Collection of Russian Chronicles

Notes

References
Aleksandr Bobrov, "15th Century Novgorod Chronicles",  Александр Григорьевич Бобров, "Новгородские летописи XV века", 2001,  Институт русской литературы (Пушкинский дом)

East Slavic chronicles
Novgorod Republic
15th-century history books